Sébastien Cantini (born 31 July 1987) is a French professional football player who currently plays as a defender for amateur-side ES Fosséenne . He started his career with CS Sedan Ardennes, and had a loan spell at Vannes OC during the 2010–11 season.

References

 
 Sébastien Cantini profile at foot-national.com

1987 births
Living people
People from Martigues
French footballers
Association football defenders
CS Sedan Ardennes players
Vannes OC players
AC Arlésien players
Ligue 2 players
Sportspeople from Bouches-du-Rhône
Footballers from Provence-Alpes-Côte d'Azur